Roger Christian (born 25 February 1944) is an English set decorator, production designer and feature film director. He won an Academy Award for his work on the original Star Wars and was Oscar-nominated for his work on Alien. Christian directed the second unit on both Return of the Jedi and Star Wars: Episode I – The Phantom Menace as well as feature films including The Sender and Nostradamus. He also directed the 2000 film Battlefield Earth which is regarded as one of the worst films ever made.

Career
He began his career as an assistant art director on several UK productions including the Hammer Studios film And Soon the Darkness (1970). He won an Academy Award for set decoration on the science fiction classic Star Wars (1977). (Christian claims to be the third crew member hired for the project.) Two years later, Christian received his second Oscar nomination for his work as the production designer on Ridley Scott's Alien (1979). Christian's use of aircraft scrap and other machinery to dress the set interiors of these films and creation of weapons using old working guns adapted by adding junk revolutionized the look of science fiction films. Christian maintained his working relationship with George Lucas over the years, having worked on Return of the Jedi (1983) and being the second unit director on Star Wars: Episode I – The Phantom Menace (1999). He later briefly met with the Episode VII art department and Star Wars Rebels crew, although not in an official capacity.

Christian began his directing career with the shorts Black Angel (1980) and the Oscar-winning The Dollar Bottom (1981).  Black Angel, filmed at locations in Scotland, was mentored by George Lucas who tied the film as a programme with The Empire Strikes Back in UK, Australia, and Scandinavia. The 25-minute film is a retelling of the hero's journey in classical mythology, and it influenced several major directors. He made his feature film debut with the horror film The Sender (1982). Chosen as the opening film at the Avoriaz Film Festival, the film has become a cult classic.  Quentin Tarantino has described The Sender as his favorite horror film of 1982. Christian directed the music video "Election Day" by the band Arcadia in Paris, France in 1985. His 1994 feature film Nostradamus, about the life of the famous French prophet, has received worldwide recognition.

His biggest project to date was the big budget L. Ron Hubbard science fiction adaptation Battlefield Earth (2000) starring John Travolta and Barry Pepper, which The Guardian considered a commercial and critical disaster, and as one of the "worst films ever made". In 2009, NPR declared the film "the worst science fiction film of the decade". Christian doesn't consider Battlefield Earth to be a "Scientology movie" as he intended it as a throwback to regular science fiction. He also won the Golden Raspberry Award for Worst Director.

In 2006, he directed an action/adventure/mystery movie, Prisoners of the Sun, starring John Rhys-Davies, David Charvet, Carmen Chaplin, and Gulshan Grover. It was unreleased until 2014 when it had geographically limited release in Nordic countries.

Personal life
Christian is a Buddhist. He is an admirer of filmmakers Peter Jackson and Quentin Tarantino.

Filmography

Directorial credits

Producing credits

Technical credits

Awards

References

External links
 (archived)

Official Black Angel website (archived)

1944 births
Living people
Best Art Direction Academy Award winners
British production designers
English set decorators
English Buddhists
Film directors from London